Transvaalbuurt (Amsterdam) is a neighborhood of Amsterdam, Netherlands.

Origin 
The Transvaalbuurt was part of the municipality of Nieuwer Amstel until it was annexed by the city of Amsterdam in 1896 as part of its annexation of the northern part of Nieuwer Amstel. In the years 1910-1920 construction commenced. The street plan was designed by famous Dutch architect and city planner Hendrik Petrus Berlage.

History

German occupation 
Before the Second World War, the Transvaalbuurt had a large Jewish population. During the German occupation of the Netherlands, a large part of this population was deported. 

Neighbourhoods of Amsterdam
Amsterdam-Oost